María del Carmen Rovira Gaspar (27 July 1923 – 19 September 2021) was a Spanish historian, researcher and academic. She arrived in Mexico in 1939, after the National victory in Spain.

References 

1923 births
2021 deaths
Spanish emigrants to Mexico
National Autonomous University of Mexico alumni
Academic staff of the National Autonomous University of Mexico
People from Huelva